Bring 'Em Out Live is the first live album of the American rock band FireHouse.

Track listing
 "Intro"
 "Overnight Sensation"
 "All She Wrote"
 "Lover's Lane"
 "Hold Your Fire"
 "Dream"
 "When I Look into Your Eyes"
 "Acid Rain"
 "Bringing Me Down"
 "Don't Walk Away"
 "Love of a Lifetime"
 "Reach for the Sky"
 "I Live My Life for You"
 "Here for You"
 "Don't Treat Me Bad"

Personnel
C.J. Snare - vocals, keyboards
Bill Leverty - guitars
Michael Foster - drums
Perry Richardson - bass guitar

References

FireHouse (band) albums
1999 live albums
Spitfire Records live albums